The 2008 Colchester Borough Council election took place on 1 May 2008 to elect members of Colchester Borough Council in Essex, England. One third of the council was up for election and the Conservative party lost overall control of the council to no overall control.

After the election, the composition of the council was
Conservative 27
Liberal Democrats 23
Labour 7
Independent 3

Background
After the last election in 2007 the Conservatives held half of the seats on the council with 30 councillors, while the Liberal Democrats had 21 seats, Labour 6 seats and there were 3 independents. However, in July 2007, 2 Liberal Democrat councilors, Craig and Terry Sutton, defected to the Conservatives after falling out with the local Liberal Democrat Member of parliament Bob Russell over a new community stadium. This gave the Conservatives a majority on the council with 32 of the 60 seats.

20 seats were contested at the election, with the Conservatives defending 12 of the seats. A total of 82 candidates stood at the election, including full slates from the Conservative, Liberal Democrat, Labour and Green parties, along with one candidate from the British National Party.

Election result
The Conservatives lost their majority on the council after losing 5 seats, 4 to the Liberal Democrats and 1 to Labour. Among those who lost seats were 2 members of the Conservative council cabinet, while Craig Sutton in Berechurch lost his seat to Labour after having defected to the Conservatives from the Liberal Democrats in 2007. Conservative defeats were attributed to high levels of housebuilding in the area, with the Conservatives dropping to 27 seats, while the Liberal Democrats rose to 23 seats and Labour went up to 7 seats. Meanwhile, the British National Party came fourth in High Woods ward with 131 votes after putting up the party's first candidate for Colchester council. Overall turnout at the election was 34.5%.

Following the election the Liberal Democrat, Labour and independent groups made a deal to take control over the council from the Conservatives, with Liberal Democrat Anne Turrell becoming the new leader of the council.

Ward results

Berechurch

Castle

Dedham & Langham

East Donyland

No Independent candidate as previous (16.3%).

Harbour

Highwoods

Lexden

Marks Tey

Mile End

New Town

Prettygate

St. Andrew's

St. Anne's

St. John's

Shrub End

Stanway

Tiptree

West Mersea

Wivenhoe Cross

Wivenhoe Quay

By-elections

Birch and Winstree

A by-election took place in Birch and Winstree ward on 4 December 2008 after the death of the Conservative councillor Peter Crowe. Andrew Ellis retained the seat for the Conservatives by a majority of 322 votes.

References

2008 English local elections
2008
2000s in Essex